Peeping Tom is a Belgian theatre company founded by Argentinian choreographer Gabriela Carrizo and French choreographer Franck Chartier in 2000. The pair met while working at several other Belgian companies, including Les Ballets C de la B. In 1999, they created a first location project that was set in a trailer home, titled Caravana, with future long-time collaborator Eurudike De Beul. This location project was followed by the film Une Vie Inutile (2000).

Peeping Tom's style includes elements of dance, theatre, opera and performance. Their works start out from a hyperrealist aesthetic in a concrete set, like a garden (Le Jardin, 2002), a living room (Le Salon, 2004), two trailer homes in a snow-covered landscape (32 Rue Vandenbranden, 2009), a retirement home (Vader, 2014) or a forest (Kind, 2019). Then, the directors break open this realism and create an unstable universe that defies the logic of time and space. As suggested by the companies' name, the audience bears witness to the things that usually go unsaid and unseen. Isolation leads to a subconscious world of nightmares, fears and desires, which the creators use to shed light on the dark side of a character or a community. The huis clos of family situations remains a major source of creativity for Peeping Tom.

Since their foundation, the company has created 10 shows, including Le Jardin (2002), Le Salon (2004), Le Sous Sol (2007), 32 Rue Vandenbranden (2009), A Louer (2011), Vader (2014), Moeder (2016), and Kind (2019). In addition, the choreographers have collaborated extensively with other companies across Europe. In 2013, Gabriela Carrizo created The Missing Door for Nederlands Dans Theater (NDT I), and in 2015 she directed The Land for the Residenztheater in Munich. Franck Chartier directed 33 Rue Vandenbranden in 2013 for the Göteborg Opera in Sweden. It was an adaptation of the original piece by Peeping Tom, 32 Rue Vandenbranden. In 2015, he directed The Lost Room for Nederlands Dans Theater, followed by The Hidden Floor in 2017. In 2018, Carrizo and Chartier co-directed 31 Rue Vandenbranden, an adaptation they made for the Opéra de Lyon which opened the 2018 Biennale de la Danse in Lyon.

Name and style

Name 
According to one of Peeping Tom's co-founders, Gabriela Carrizo, they chose the name 'Peeping Tom' as a reference to voyeurism. It came from their first performance, Caravana, during which the audience would look through the windows of the camping car. It was a way for them to plunge into the heart of the characters' intimacy.

Style 
The company has a distinct style. In a portrait for Contemporary Arts from Flanders, theatre scientist Lieve Dierckx describes it as:  "[...]the organic interweaving between the daily life of the performers and their artistic work, a zoom in on fears and fantasies in relational constellations that are as familiar as they are intimate in hyper-realistic stage sets." In addition, "Peeping Tom does not narrate specific stories that have a clear beginning, development and end, in their works; they create fragmentary and irrational worlds like one can experience in dreams."

To create their work, Peeping Tom also use cinematographic techniques, including sound, lights and the zoom from the camera. Moreover, according to Carrizo and Chartier, a big inspiration in their work comes from the work of the photographer Gregory Crewdson. And for their show 32 Rue Vandenbranden, they worked with Belgian cinematographer Nico Leunen, who worked as a dramaturge on the piece.

Performances

The first trilogy 
From 2002 till 2007, Peeping Tom created three shows that formed their first trilogy: Le Jardin, Le Salon (their international break-through) and Le Sous Sol. According to Lieve Dierckx, "In thematic terms this trilogy forms a house in which the performers take on the battle with the baggage they bring with them.".

Le Jardin (2002) 
Le Jardin was Peeping Tom's first show for the theatre. It was created in 2002 by Gabriela Carrizo, Franck Chartier and Dutch actor Simon Versnel. The performance was divided into two parts. The first part was a film that showed a group of diverse and unusual characters who immerse themselves in the nightlife. It symbolises a dream or a nightmare. The second part was the live performance, with the three characters - Carrizo, Chartier and Versnel - in a beautifully tended garden. The show premiered on 13 June 2002 in Ghent (Belgium).

Le Salon (2004) 
Le Salon was created in 2004 by Carrizo, Chartier and Versnel, with Mezzo-Soprano Eurudike De Beul and dancer Samuel Lefeuvre joining the cast. The show meant the international break for the Belgian company. Le Salon has been described as showing the mental, physical and financial decay of what was once a wealthy family. A unique part of the show was Carrizo and Chartier's young child, Uma Chartier. The three developed a kissing dance, which since has becoming internationally famous. Le Salon premiered on 4 November 2004 at La Rose des Vents in Villeneuve d'Ascq (France).

Le Sous Sol (2007) 
The first trilogy was closed by Le Sous Sol, which included Carrizo, Chartier, Lefeuvre, De Beul and Spanish Butoh-dancer Maria Otal. In this piece, the members of the family are now dead and buried. They continue their lived underground, where social codes no longer exist. Le Sous Sol premiered on 28 March 2007 in the Koninklijke Vlaamse Schouwburg in Brussels. It was selected for the Belgian-Dutch Theaterfestival and was performed at the Kaaitheater in Brussels. The final show took place on 24 July 2009 in Kalamata (Greece).

32 Rue Vandenbranden and A Louer 
In 2009, Gabriela Carrizo and Franck Chartier left the stage and focused on the artistic direction of Peeping Tom and on co-directing their new pieces. For the first time, the company held wide-scale auditions, resulting in a few dancers joining the company who would stay with them for several years: Belgian dancer Marie Gyselbrecht, British dancer Jos Baker, Korean dancers Hun-mok Jung and Seoljin Kim, and later Brazilian dancer Maria Carolina Vieira.

32 Rue Vandenbranden (2009) 
32 Rue Vandenbranden was the first show that Carrizo and Chartier co-directed after leaving the stage. It premiered on 28 November 2009 at the Koninklijke Vlaamse Schouwburg in Brussels. The show puts two mobile homes in an inhospitable winter landscape, and exposes the unrest in (love) relationships. Isolation and loneliness are the dark side of the desire to be loved. In an interview with Luxemburg newspaper Le Quotidien, Chartier describes it as putting an address to the house of the previous trilogy, and the show is about how we act outside, how people live in a closed community and what happens when two strangers arrive to this village. 32 Rue Vandenbranden has opened up new countries and cities to Peeping Tom. They performed in London for the first time in 2015, during the International London Mime Festival, and went to the United States in 2019, performing at the BAM Next Wave Festival.

A Louer (2011) 
A Louer was created in 2011, with the premiere taking place on 15 October 2011 at KVS in Brussels. The piece addresses the theme of transience: a fading but talented opera diva wanders around in an overwhelming interior and struggles with the expectations of a bourgeois environment. Nothing is certain or permanent (including the decor), except for her own recurring fears. Fearsome sounds highlight the insignificance of the characters. For this creation, Carrizo and Chartier worked again with Simon Versnel (with whom they hadn't worked on a new creation since Le Salon in 2004), and invited Leo De Beul - the father of mezzo-soprano Eurudike De Beul - to join them on stage.

The second trilogy 

After the creation of A Louer, Carrizo and Chartier took on offers outside of the company: Carrizo went to work on The missing door with Nederlands Dans Theater, while Chartier recreated Peeping Tom's 32 Rue Vandenbranden for the Göteborg Opera, titled 33 Rue Vandenbranden. Within the company, they started to work differently again, focusing each on another show to direct. According to Gabriela Carrizo, they wanted to change the dynamics and see how each could operate on their own. This would become the starting point for their second trilogy: Vader (2014), Moeder (2016) and Kind (2019). Moreover, the company added two new dancers to their ensemble: the Taiwanese dancer Yi-chun Liu and the Belgian dancer Brandon Lagaert.

Vader (2014) 
Franck Chartier directed Vader, with Gabriela Carrizo working alongside him as directorial assistant and dramaturge. The piece is set in the visiting area of a retirement home, whose towering walls accentuate the fact that the action takes place deep underground. At the centre of this netherworld, somewhere between the world of the living and the dead, stands the figure of the father, who seems to be distancing himself gradually from the human community. His fading is drawn, not from the story of one individual, but from the mythology of the father, and in scenes that explode into action, and just as suddenly stop, this figure appears at once as God-like and ridiculous, as possessed of a rich mental life, and as disconnected, decaying, empty. His past may harbour a deep secret, or maybe he is simply mad or delusional. The other residents and the staff wonder at him, regarding him with amusement and hatred, affection and indifference. Vader premiered on 10 May 2014 in Ludwigshafen, Germany.

Moeder (2016) 
For the second part of their family trilogy, Carrizo and Chartier reversed their roles. Now Gabriela Carrizo was directing, with Franck Chartier acting as directorial assistant and dramaturge. In an interview with Bachtrack, Gabriela Carrizo explained the idea behind Moeder: "Moeder is not about one mother, but about several mothers. We talk about motherhood, the absence and the lack of it. The play searches the memory and the subconscious to reveal what the mother carries as desires, fears, sufferings or violence. [...] Moeder opens on a funeral and then winds up the thread of memories. Due to the aseptic and museum-like handling of the staging, and the distance between the characters, we also evoke the process of distancing in the memory, especially in intense moments of life. Moeder is not a catharsis, but it is certain that I have projected much of myself, also unconsciously. The idea of a museum is in particular a reference to my mother's funeral, where we had exhibited paintings.." Moeder had its world premiere on 29 September 2016 in Ludwigshafen, Germany.

Kind (2019) 
For the final part of their family trilogy, Gabriela Carrizo and Franck Chartier decided to co-direct again. Kind premiered on 23 April 2019 at Les Théâtres de la Ville du Luxembourg, in Luxemburg. The basis for Kind is the perspective of the child and children's internal and external world. Every action is driven by how children see the world, by their fears and desires. The choreographers investigate how a child's perspective changes as it grows and develops itself on its way to adolescence and adulthood, with all the associated choices, pressures, fears, doubts and physical changes, and how this translates into gestures and body language.

New creations 
In 2019, the company announced a new round of international auditions, the first time since 2013. They stated that they were looking for an entirely new cast for a new creation. This creation would start in the course of 2020. In the end, the company chose eight new performers: French dancers Konan Dayot and Fanny Sage, Spanish dancer Alejandro Moya, Australian dancer Lauren Langlois, Taiwanese dancer Wan-Lun Yu, Italian dancer Eliana Stragapede, Belgian dancer Fons Dhossche and Cypriot dancer Panos Malactos.

Triptych: The missing door, The lost room and The hidden floor (2020) 
The company announced the title for their new creation in 2019: Triptych: The missing door, The lost room and The hidden floor. It is an adaptation of the three pieces that Gabriela Carrizo and Franck Chartier created between 2013 and 2017 with Nederlands Dans Theater. Peeping Tom produces the show themselves and will tour it with the eight new castmembers. The show is scheduled to premiere in 2020. It is also available in a smaller format, called Diptych: The missing door and The lost room.

Collaborations 
Since 2013, choreographers Gabriela Carrizo and Franck Chartier have opened up to collaborations with other companies, aside from their work with Peeping Tom.

Work with Nederlands Dans Theater 
In 2013, Gabriela Carrizo was invited to make a first short piece with the dancers of NDT I at Nederlands Dans Theater. This would become The missing door. In the piece, Gabriela Carrizo shows two parallel dimensions in this creation. We are witnessing the last minutes of life, which take place in the twilight zone between life and death. The dying man anxiously tries to find a way through the intricate maze of his thoughts. While soundscapes of everyday sounds turn into lost rhythms, the man performs a lonely battle with time, space and those who are absent.

In 2015, it was Chartier's turn to create a piece with NDT I. He made a sequel to The missing door, called The lost room. It is set on a ship at sea, where freedom and entrapment go hand in hand. In a labyrinth of rooms and corridors, several stories are told simultaneously. Characters seemingly exist in every time and every place. The lost room could be seen as a melancholic nostalgia for the future. In addition, memories are often not a literal reproduction of the past, but instead rely on constructive processes that are sometimes prone to error and distortion.

Franck Chartier returned to Nederlands Dans Theater in 2017, to create the short piece The hidden floor. The piece addresses some of the themes that were already present in the previous two productions: the memory, the disruption of time. The characters find themselves in a public space, maybe a restaurant, taken over by nature. They are experiencing their final moments as the water slowly starts to rise. Holding on to their last hope, they try to survive and find a way out, not only physically but also mentally.

Adaptations of 32 Rue Vandenbranden 
In 2013, Franck Chartier went to the Göteborg Opera in Sweden to work on an adaptation of Peeping Tom's original piece, 32 Rue Vandenbranden. With the ballet company of the opera, he created 33 Rue Vandenbranden. In 2018, Carrizo and Chartier joined forces to create another adaptation of the piece. This time, they created 31 Rue Vandenbranden for the Opéra de Lyon. For this piece, they doubled the parts, going from six dancers in the original piece to about fifteen in the adaptation.

The Land 
In 2015, Peeping Tom collaborated with Residenz Theater in Germany and made The Land, directed by Gabriela Carrizo. The Land plunges its audience into a world in which the loss of the self stands central. The "game" commences with a village community finding itself in the midst of a miniature landscape. A story rich in paradoxes unravels, revolving around the notions of inconsistency and alienation, proximity and distance whilst toying with the way we perceive the world around us.

Other projects

Documentary about Peeping Tom 
Belgian documentary filmmakers Mieke Struyve and Lotte Stoops approached Peeping Tom to make a documentary about life behind the scenes. Third Act follows the company on tour around the world with the trilogy Vader, Moeder and Kind. The theme of this trilogy, ageing and family, touches everybody's lives, including those of the actors themselves. In the film sublimated theatrical stories are woven together with sensitive personal contributions. At each stop on the international tour, Peeping Tom works with local senior citizens as extras. These extras have been sought out beforehand and receive a crash-course in acting before they step onto the stage, often for the first time in their lives. Their personal lives provide an insight into ageing in their countries and create a dialogue with what Peeping Tom presents on stage.

Artist-in-Residence at the KMSKA in Antwerp 
Peeping Tom was invited to develop a project as Artist in Residence for the Royal Museum of Fine Arts in Antwerp (KMSKA). During the museum's renovation, the performers will develop a project with the museum's collection. The project has been pushed back, since the opening of the museum has also been delayed till beginning of 2022.

Awards 
In 2005, Le Salon was awarded the Prix du Meilleur Spectacle de Danse (Best Dance Show Prize) in France. In 2007, the company received the Mont Blanc Young Directors Award during the Salzburg Festival and the Patrons Circle Award at the Melbourne International Arts Festival. The pieces Le Sous Sol and A Louer were both selected for the Theaterfestival, which gathers the best shows of the season in Belgium and The Netherlands. In 2013, A Louer was nominated for the prestigious Ubu Awards in Italy, in the category Best Performance in Foreign Language, during the theatrical season 2012–2013. 32 rue Vandenbranden was elected Best Dance Show of the Year 2013 in São Paulo (BR) by magazine Guia Folha and won in 2015 a prestigious Olivier Award, in the category 'Best New Dance Production'.

Peeping Tom's latest production, Vader (Father), is the first part of the trilogy Father-Mother-Children. It premiered on 10 May 2014 in Theater im Pfalzbau (Ludwigshafen, DE) and was elected Best Dance Performance of 2014 by Dutch newspaper NRC Handelsblad. The jury of the 'Premios de la Crítica Barcelona' awarded Vader in its turn with a first prize in the category 'Best International Dance Production of 2014'.

References

External links
 Official website
Review in El País 

Musical theatre companies